The Battle of Svitlodarsk was a battle in the War in Donbas near Svitlodarsk, Donetsk Oblast in 2016. It was described as the "bloodiest battle in 5 months".

The battle 
It is unclear who initiated the heavy fighting near Svitlodarsk on 18 December 2016, with both sides accusing each other of starting the battle. According to the Ukrainians, the separatists launched three attacks on Ukrainian positions, with all of them being repelled. During the fighting, the separatists reportedly conducted three rounds of shelling of Ukrainian positions, with each lasting three to six hours. The shelling was claimed to had originated from residential areas in the village of Kalynivka, and the towns of Vuhlehirsk and Debaltseve, which prevented the Ukrainian military from responding due to fear of inflicting potential civilian casualties. Ukrainian forces also claimed to had advanced 1.5 kilometers near the village of Luhanske, seizing a strategic height from the separatists, Hill 223. According to the separatists, the fighting started when they themselves came under attack by the Ukrainian military near Debaltseve, but managed to eventually repulse the assault. According to a separatist Luhansk People's Republic (LPR) official, 40 Ukrainian soldiers conducted the attack, supported by heavy artillery fire, with 150 shells being fired near the village of Kalynivka. In all, 2,900 explosions were recorded in the region during the day, most around Svitlodarsk.

Later, it was reported that on 18 December, the Ukrainians seized four or possibly five other points on the left bank of the Hryazevskyi pond after launching their attack.

Another separatist attack was reportedly repulsed on 20 December, when three groups of 3–5 fighters attempted to assault Ukrainian positions after a mortar attack. On 22 December, separatist shelling left almost a dozen Ukrainian soldiers wounded, while the LPR militia reported an attempted Ukrainian breakthrough by 50 soldiers and three IFVs near Debaltseve was repelled. The next day, the Ukrainians stated a new separatist ground assault supported by shelling and armored vehicles was driven off.

For the first time in six days, no fighting took place in the Svitlodarsk area on 24 December, after a general ceasefire came into effect at midnight.

Aftermath 
On 24 December, the Special Monitoring Mission of the OSCE was forced to evacuate their patrol base in Svitlodarsk due to artillery attacks nearby. They returned on 26 December.

On 25 December, the Ukrainian military and the separatists exchanged the bodies of two Ukrainian soldiers and two separatist fighters killed during the fighting at Svitlodarsk in Shchastia. The same day, a new round of shelling was reported in the Svitlodarsk area.

On 28 December, the separatists reportedly deployed Grad MLRSs near the Svitlodarsk area.

On 4 February 2017, Oleg Anashchenko was assassinated by car bombing in Luhansk.

See also 
 Outline of the Russo-Ukrainian War
 Vuhlehirska Power Station

References 

Svitlodarsk
2016 in Ukraine
History of Donetsk Oblast
Svitlodarsk
December 2016 events in Ukraine
Battles involving the Donetsk People's Republic